William, Bill or Billy Murphy may refer to:

Arts and entertainment
 William B. Murphy (1908–1970), American film editor
 William Murphy (actor) (1921–1989), American actor
 Billy Murphy (fashion entrepreneur) (1940–2014), British fashion entrepreneur
 William Murphy (musician) (born 1973), American gospel musician

Business and industry
 William John Murphy (1839–1923), American businessman, founder of Glendale, Arizona
 William Martin Murphy (1844–1919), Irish industrialist and newspaper proprietor, involved in the Dublin Lockout
 William Dennistoun Murphy (1859–1935), American real estate manager
 William Lawrence Murphy (1876–1959), Irish-American inventor of the Murphy bed
 William Beverly Murphy (1907–1994), American food industry executive

Politics and law

Australia
 William Edward Murphy (1833–1881), Australian politician, member of the Queensland Legislative Assembly
 William Murphy (Australian politician) (1858–1929), Australian politician, member of the New South Wales and Western Australian parliaments
 William Murphy (Queensland politician) (1868–1930), Australian politician and newspaper proprietor, member of the Queensland Legislative Assembly
 William Emmet Murphy, Australian trade unionist and politician

U.S.
 William Sumter Murphy (1796–1844), American lawyer and diplomat
 William P. Murphy (judge) (1898–1986), American attorney, member of the Minnesota Supreme Court
 William T. Murphy (1899–1978), American politician, U.S. Representative from Illinois
 William J. Murphy (Idaho politician) (1912–1993), American politician, Lieutenant Governor of Idaho
 Billy Murphy Jr. (born 1943), American attorney, judge, and civil rights advocate
 William L. Murphy (1944–2010), American lawyer, Staten Island (Richmond County) District Attorney
 William J. Murphy (Rhode Island politician) (born 1963), American politician, Rhode Island state representative
 William Murphy (Wisconsin legislator), Irish-born American merchant, member of the Wisconsin State Assembly

Elsewhere
 William Samuel Murphy (1882–1961), Canadian politician
 William Lindsay Murphy (1888–1965), British Governor of the Bahamas
 William Murphy (Irish politician) (1892–1967), Irish Fine Gael TD
 William J. Murphy (Labour politician) (1928–2018), Irish Labour Party politician

Religion
 William Murphy (bishop of Saginaw) (1885–1950), American Roman Catholic bishop
 William Murphy (bishop of Kerry) (born 1936), Irish Roman Catholic bishop
 William Murphy (bishop of Rockville Centre) (born 1940), American Roman Catholic bishop

Sport

Baseball
 Yale Murphy (William Henry Murphy, 1869–1906), American Major League Baseball player and college football coach
 Billy Murphy (baseball) (born 1944), American Major League Baseball outfielder
 Bill Murphy (pitcher) (born 1981), American Major League Baseball pitcher
 Bill Murphy (baseball coach), American baseball coach

Other sports
 Torpedo Billy Murphy (1863–1939), featherweight boxer from New Zealand
 William Murphy (lacrosse) (1867–1957), American Olympic lacrosse player
 William Murphy (rugby union) (c.1880–c.1957), Australian rugby union footballer
 William Murphy (rower) (1889–1916), Canadian Olympic rower
 Billy Murphy (footballer) (1895–1962), English footballer
 William Murphy (boxer) (1904–?), Irish Olympic boxer
 William Murphy (tennis) (1917–2005), American tennis player and coach
 Bill Murphy (footballer) (1921–2004), English footballer
 Billy J. Murphy (1921–2008), American college football coach at the University of Memphis
 Bill Murphy (businessman) (born 1946), American NFL football player and businessman

Others
 William P. Murphy (1892–1987), American physician and Nobel laureate
 William J. Murphy (RAF officer) (1916–1939), British Royal Air Force pilot
 William P. Murphy Jr. (born 1923), American scientist and inventor

See also
 Willie Murphy (disambiguation)